The 2022 PGA Tour Champions season was the 42nd in which PGA Tour Champions, a golf tour for men age 50 and over, has operated. The tour officially began in 1980 as the Senior PGA Tour.

Steven Alker won four tournaments, including the KitchenAid Senior PGA Championship en route to claiming the Player of the Year award.

Schedule
The following table lists official events during the 2022 season.

Unofficial events
The following events were sanctioned by the PGA Tour Champions, but did not carry official money, nor were wins official.

Charles Schwab Cup
The Charles Schwab Cup was based on prize money won during the season, calculated using a points-based system.

Awards

See also
PGA Tour Champions awards
PGA Tour Champions records
2022 European Senior Tour

Notes

References

PGA Tour Champions seasons
PGA Tour Champions